Guri is a 1986 Indian Kannada-language action film, directed by  P. Vasu and produced by Parvathamma Rajkumar. The film stars Rajkumar, Archana and Jai Jagadish, with Pandari Bai in a guest appearance. The film has musical score by Rajan–Nagendra. This was director P. Vasu's second movie as independent director in any language. The film was remade in Tamil in 1991 by P. Vasu himself as Adhikari. This was the last movie of Rajkumar which was remade in other language.

Plot
Customs Officer Kaliprasad is newly deputed and nabs a notorious gang of smugglers. While handing them over to police, he befriends the local police inspector. Living with his retired School Teacher father and young sister, he leads a contented life. His happiness doubles when the police inspector is engaged to his sister.

However, Rudrayya, the corrupt mafia leader is irritated by Kaliprasad's efficiency. Kaliprasad's work is threatening his illegal business and he wants to set Kaliprasad right. Kaliprasad snubs Rudrayya and kicks him out of his house, when he invites to Kaliprasad to the wrong side of the law.

Enraged, Rudrayya gets Kaliprasad framed on smuggling charges and is imprisoned, his sister's engagement gets broken. Kali's sister kills herself. Kali's father loses mental balance. Dejected as to where his ideals led him and his family, Kali escapes from Police imprisonment and plots his revenge against Rudrayya, taking the law into his own hands. Disguising himself as a Muslim Cleric, Military Officer and others, he breaks Rudrayya's illegal empire. He also rescues a village belle and loves her. However, nothing can deter him from his aim, Seeing Rudrayya's end. He kills Rudrayya, while he is watching the movie "Johnny Yuma" and himself succumbs to police fire.

Cast

Rajkumar as Kaliprasad 
Archana as Shantadevi
Pandari Bai in Guest Appearance
Jai Jagadish as Inspector Sadanand
Mukhyamantri Chandru as Rudrayya
Loknath
Thoogudeepa Srinivas as Vishwanath
Thimmayya
Sadashiva Brahmavar as Kaliprasad's father, school master
Sathish as Kashinath
Vishwanath
Shivaprakash
Bhatti Mahadevappa
Go Ra Bheema Rao
Venkatappa
Tara
Shobha
Shyamala
Shanthamma
Swapna
Mala
Pinku
Prathibha
Honnavalli Krishna
D. M. Kumar
Ashwath Narayan
Kunigal Ramanath
Jr. Narasimharaju
M. S. Karanth

Soundtrack
The songs by the Rajan–Nagendra duo were instant hits and well received.

References

External links
 

1986 films
1980s Kannada-language films
Films scored by Rajan–Nagendra
Films directed by P. Vasu
Kannada films remade in other languages